Faith Bandler  (27 September 1918  13 February 2015; née Ida Lessing Faith Mussing) was an Australian civil rights activist of South Sea Islander and Scottish-Indian heritage. A campaigner for the rights of Indigenous Australians and South Sea Islanders, she was best known for her leadership in the campaign for the 1967 referendum on Aboriginal Australians.

Early life and family
Bandler was born in Tumbulgum, New South Wales, and raised on a farm near Murwillumbah. Her father Wacvie Mussingkon, son of Baddick and Lessing Mussingkon, had been blackbirded from Biap, on Ambrym Island, in what is now Vanuatu as a boy, aged about 13 years, in 1883. He was then sent to Mackay, Queensland, before being sent to work on a sugar cane plantation. He later escaped and married Bandler's mother, a Scottish–Indian woman from New South Wales.

Mussingkon's abduction was part of blackbirding, the practice which brought cheap labour to help establish the Australian sugar industry. He was later known as Peter Mussing, a lay preacher and worked on a banana plantation outside Murwillumbah. He died when Bandler was five years old. Bandler cited stories of her father's harsh experience as a slave labourer as a strong motivation for her activism.

In 1934, Bandler left school and moved to Sydney, where she worked as a dressmaker's apprentice.

Career

Early career
During World War II, Bandler and her sister Kath served in the Australian Women's Land Army, working on fruit farms. Bandler and indigenous workers received less pay than white workers. After being discharged in 1945, she started to campaign for equal pay for indigenous workers. After the war, Bandler moved to the Sydney suburb of Kings Cross, New South Wales where she also worked as an abuse activist.

Community activism
In 1956, Bandler became a full-time activist, co-founding and becoming active in the Sydney-based Indigenous rights organisation Aboriginal-Australian Fellowship along with Pearl Gibbs, Bert Groves, and Grace Bardsley.

Bandler also became involved with the Federal Council for Aboriginal Advancement (FCAA, later FCAATSI), which was formed in 1957. During this period, Bandler worked with her mentors Pearl Gibbs and Jessie Street. As general secretary of FCAA, Bandler led the campaign for a constitutional referendum to remove discriminatory provisions from the Constitution of Australia. The campaign, which included several massive petitions and hundreds of public meetings arranged by Bandler, resulted in the 1967 referendum being put to the people by the Holt government. The referendum succeeded in all six states, attracting nearly 91 percent support across the country, which gave the Federal Government the power to make laws for Indigenous Australians in states, as well as including them in population counts (the Australian census).

In 1975, Bandler visited Ambrym Island, where her father had been kidnapped 92 years before. Throughout the 1970s, Bandler was a prominent member of the Women's Electoral Lobby in New South Wales.

Writing

In 1974, Bandler started working on four books, two histories of the 1967 referendum, an account of her brother's life in New South Wales, and a novel about her father's experience of blackbirding in Queensland. Beginning in 1974, she also started campaigning for the rights of South Sea Islander Australians. According to Bandler's biographer, feminist writer and historian Marilyn Lake, this campaign was more challenging than the FCAATSI campaign for the 1967 referendum, since Bandler was fighting on two fronts. Not only was she battling historians who insisted that the blackbirded South Sea Islanders were actually voluntary indentured servants, but she was also to some extent ostracised by indigenous Australians in the Australian civil rights movement, due to the increasing influence of separatist Black Power ideology.

Personal life 
In 1952, Faith married Hans Bandler, a Jewish refugee from Vienna, Austria, and lived in Frenchs Forest. During the war, Hans had been interned in the Nazi labour camps.

The couple had a daughter, Lilon Gretl, born in 1954, and a fostered Aboriginal Australian son, Peter (Manual Armstrong). However, they lost touch with Peter when he later left to find his own family.

Hans died in 2009. Faith Bandler died at the age of 96 in February 2015.

Honours and awards 
Bandler was:
 appointed a Member of the Order of the British Empire (MBE) in 1976, but she declined to accept it
 appointed a Member of the Order of Australia (AM) on 11 June 1984, in recognition of her service to Aboriginal welfare
 awarded an honorary doctorate from Macquarie University in 1994
 awarded the 1997 Human Rights Medal by the then Human Rights and Equal Opportunity Commission
 named as one of the 100 inaugural Australian Living Treasures by the National Trust of Australia
 invested as a Companion of the Order of Australia (AC) on 26 January 2009 (Australia Day)
included on the Victorian Honour Roll of Women in 2001

A 1993 portrait of Bandler by artist Margaret Woodward is held by the State Library of New South Wales.

Following her death, Prime Minister Tony Abbott offered Bandler's family a state funeral.

Selected works
Bandler's published works include:

References

External links
 
 
 Faith Bandler on the National Museum of Australia website Collaborating for Indigenous Rights 1957 – 1973 
 Faith Bandler at the National Museum of Australia 
 

1918 births
2015 deaths
Australian people of Indian descent
Australian people of Scottish descent
Australian people of Vanuatuan descent
Australian feminist writers
Australian indigenous rights activists
Women human rights activists
Australian women writers
Companions of the Order of Australia
Australian Members of the Order of the British Empire
Writers from New South Wales
Australian women novelists
Australian women in World War II